USS Cinnamon (AN-50/YN-69) was an  which served with the U.S. Navy in the South Pacific Ocean theatre of operations during World War II. Her career was without major incident, and she returned home after the war bearing one battle star to her credit.

Launched in California
Cinnamon (YN-69) was launched 6 June 1943 as Royal Palm by Pollock-Stockton Shipbuilding Company, Stockton, California; sponsored by Mrs. E. R. Ward; renamed Cinnamon 7 December 1943; and commissioned 10 January 1944. She was reclassified AN-50 on 20 January 1944.

World War II service

Departing San Diego, California, 6 April 1944, Cinnamon arrived at Milne Bay, New Guinea, 18 May. She supported operations in the New Guinea area until 17 January 1945 when she sailed to Manus and the Philippines, where she remained until 17 November.

Post-war service
She sailed for San Francisco, California, arriving 22 December, and from 8 January to 15 November 1946, Cinnamon operated under Commandant, 11th Naval District out of San Pedro, California.  Arriving at Pearl Harbor 25 November 1946, she departed 21 January 1947 and sailed via Wake Island and Guam to Shanghai, arriving 15 March.

Decommissioning in China
Cinnamon was decommissioned 25 March 1947 and transferred to Nationalist China through the U.S. State Department.

Honors and awards
Cinnamon was awarded one battle star for service in World War II.

References
 
 NavSource Online: Service Ship Photo Archive - YN-69 Royal Palm / Cinnamon - AN-50 Cinnamon

 

Ailanthus-class net laying ships of the United States Navy
Ships built in Stockton, California
1943 ships
World War II net laying ships of the United States